Vittorio Coccia (18 May 1918 – 3 November 1982) was an Italian professional football player.

1918 births
1982 deaths
People from Vasto
Italian footballers
Serie A players
Inter Milan players
Aurora Pro Patria 1919 players
U.S. Salernitana 1919 players
U.S. Lecce players
Vastese Calcio 1902 players
Calcio Padova players
Taranto F.C. 1927 players
Delfino Pescara 1936 players
Italian expatriate footballers
Expatriate soccer players in Australia
Italian expatriate sportspeople in Australia
Association football midfielders
Vigevano Calcio players
Sportspeople from the Province of Chieti
Footballers from Abruzzo